William Edwin Bell (27 October 194530 July 2016) was a Canadian author of young adult fiction, born in Toronto, Ontario. He lived in Orillia, Ontario.

Education
His novel Crabbe was partly inspired by his days as a student at New Toronto Secondary School. Bell had a master's degree in literature and a second master's in education curriculum and administration, both from the University of Toronto.

Teaching career
Bell taught in a variety of settings. He was a high school teacher at several schools in Simcoe County and the head of the English department at Orillia District Collegiate & Vocational Institute. He was a teacher in China at the Harbin University of Science and Technology and the Foreign Affairs College. He also worked at the University of British Columbia and the Simcoe County Board of Education. He was frequently invited to give presentations at conferences and to speak to elementary and secondary school students on creative writing.

Writing career
The inspiration to become a writer came to Bell when he heard a speech by John Metcalf, author of one of his favourite short stories. Bell says he likes to write for young people because they are "the best audience: they are loyal to the writers they like and they are enthusiastic readers".

Bell wrote many books, including three set near his home in Orillia, Ontario (Five Days of the Ghost, Stones and Fanatics), two in Barrie (Death Wind, The Cripples' Club), one in Toronto (Julian) and one in Fergus (Zack).

Bell's work has been widely published outside of Canada. His books have been translated into Chinese, French, German, Spanish, Polish, Swedish, Finnish, Norwegian, Danish, Dutch and Japanese.

Personal life
He was born 27 October 1945 in Toronto, son of William and Irene Bell. He married Susan Arnup and had three children: Dylan, Megan and Brendan. He lived with his wife, Chinese-Canadian author Ting-Xing Ye. He died in Orillia on 30 July 2016 at the age of 70.

Awards and honors 
 Ruth Schwartz Award (Forbidden City 1991)
 Mr. Christie's Book Awards (Zack 1999)
 Belgium Prize for Excellence (Forbidden City 1993)
 Canadian Library Association Young Adult Book Award (Stones 2002)
 Manitoba Young Readers' Choice Awards (Five Days of the Ghost 1992, Stones 2003)

Books 
 Crabbe - 1986 
 Metal Head - 1987
 The Cripples' Club - 1988 (reissued in 1993 as Absolutely Invincible)
 Death Wind - 1989
 Five Days of the Ghost - 1989
 Forbidden City - 1990
 No Signature - 1992
 Speak to the Earth - 1994
 The Golden Disk - 1995 (a picture book)
 River My Friend - 1996 (a picture book)
 Zack - 1998
 Stones - 2001
 Alma - 2003
 Throwaway Daughter – 2003  (written with his wife Ting-Xing Ye)
 Just Some Stuff I Wrote - 2005
 The Blue Helmet - 2006
 Only in the Movies - 2010
 Fanatics - 2011
 Julian - 2014

References

External links
  (Ting-xing Ye and Bell)
 Orillia Hall of Fame
 
 

1945 births
2016 deaths
Canadian children's writers
Canadian male novelists
Writers from Toronto
20th-century Canadian novelists
20th-century Canadian male writers